Erik Tandberg (August 28, 1913 – January 22, 1964 in Oslo) was a Norwegian bobsledder who competed in the early 1950s. At the 1952 Winter Olympics in Oslo, he finished 14th in the two-man event.

References

External links
1952 bobsleigh two-man results

Bobsledders at the 1952 Winter Olympics
Norwegian male bobsledders
1964 deaths
1913 births